John David Weathers (born September 25, 1969) is an American former Major League Baseball pitcher. He was a part of the New York Yankees' 1996 World Series championship over the Atlanta Braves. He bats and throws right-handed.

Early career
Weathers attended Motlow State Community College in Moore County, Tennessee, and was drafted by the Toronto Blue Jays in the 3rd round of the 1988 Major League Baseball Draft. Weathers made his Major League debut with the Blue Jays on August 2, 1991, and was drafted by the Florida Marlins in the 1992 Major League Baseball expansion draft.

Mid-career
Weathers played for the Marlins until , when he was traded to the New York Yankees for Mark Hutton. Weathers won a World Series with the Yankees that year. He was traded by the Yankees to the Cleveland Indians on June 9, 1997, for outfielder Chad Curtis. On December 20, 1997, he was claimed off waivers by the Cincinnati Reds. On June 24, 1998, Weathers was claimed off waivers by the Milwaukee Brewers. Weathers stayed with Milwaukee until July 30, 2001, when he was traded to the Chicago Cubs, along with Robert Miniel, for Ruben Quevedo and Pete Zoccolillo. He became a free agent at the end of the season and signed with the New York Mets. Weathers pitched for the Mets until June 17, 2004, when he and Jeremy Griffiths were traded to the Houston Astros for Richard Hidalgo. Weathers was released by the Astros on September 7, 2004, and signed with the Marlins the very next day.

Later career
A free agent at the end of the season, Weathers signed with the Cincinnati Reds (returning to the team he played for in early 1998), where he has had an ERA under 4.00 every year that he was with the club.

On August 9, 2009, the Cincinnati Reds traded Weathers to the Milwaukee Brewers for a player to be named later. Weathers was quoted as saying of Cincinnati, "I really felt like this is probably where I would end my career, and I really wanted to. But in this game, things don't go like you want them or how you plan them. It's a good day but, to be honest with you, it's a tough day emotionally because you form a lot of bonds, a lot of trust with guys you've been with for five or six years. You just don't find that every day, especially in this game." Weathers played 25 more games with the Brewers before playing in his final Major League game on October 3, 2009.

Personal life
His son, Ryan Weathers, was drafted by the San Diego Padres in the first round of the 2018 Major League Baseball draft.

References

External links

1969 births
Living people
American expatriate baseball players in Canada
People from Lawrenceburg, Tennessee
Toronto Blue Jays players
Florida Marlins players
New York Yankees players
Cleveland Indians players
Cincinnati Reds players
Milwaukee Brewers players
Chicago Cubs players
New York Mets players
Houston Astros players
Baseball players from Tennessee
Major League Baseball pitchers
St. Catharines Blue Jays players
Myrtle Beach Blue Jays players
Dunedin Blue Jays players
Knoxville Blue Jays players
Syracuse Chiefs players
Edmonton Trappers players
Brevard County Manatees players
Charlotte Knights players
Columbus Clippers players
Buffalo Bisons (minor league) players
Dayton Dragons players
Louisville Bats players
Motlow State Bucks baseball players